Praise Onubiyi (born 10 August 1989) is a Nigerian football player who currently plays for Čáslav.

Onubiyi is a striker known for his speed, power and strength in the air.  He began his career at youth level with Puma FC in Abuja before playing two seasons with Abuja FC in the second division in Nigeria.  At that point in time he was invited for trials in Italy which were ultimately unsuccessful.  In 2009, he went for trials in Finland and then Poland, eventually signing for Polish club MKS Kutno.  Onubiyi now plies his trade with FK Zenit Caslav where he is currently on 6 goals in 12 matches 

Onubiye has 2 caps with the Equatorial Guinea national team, though it remains unknown what his connection to the country is as a Nigerian national.

References

External links
 
 fkcaslav.cz (Czech]

1989 births
Living people
Nigerian footballers
FK Čáslav players
Association football forwards
Abuja F.C. players
People from Abuja